Steve Bigle Mountain is a summit located in Adirondack Mountains of New York located in the Town of Wells east-northeast of the hamlet of Wells.

References

Mountains of Hamilton County, New York
Mountains of New York (state)